Alan Swinbank (c.1945 – 17 May 2017) was a British racehorse trainer whose horses competed in both Flat racing and National Hunt racing. Swinbank was based at racing stables in Melsonby, North Yorkshire. He trained the winners of more than 800 races in a career lasting from 1982 until his death, and gained his most notable success with Collier Hill. He died suddenly on 17 May 2017, aged 72.

Major wins 
Canada
 Canadian International Stakes - Collier Hill (2006)
Hong Kong
 Hong Kong Vase - Collier Hill (2006)
Ireland
 Irish St. Leger - Collier Hill (2005)

References 

1940s births
2017 deaths
British racehorse trainers